William Brown FRCP (5 December 1881 – 17 May 1952) was a British psychologist and psychiatrist.

Biography

Brown was born in Slinfold, Sussex. He studied mathematics and philosophy at Christ Church, Oxford. He took medical
training at King's College London and graduated MBBCh in Oxford in 1914. He worked as a neurologist in France where he helped develop a treatment for shell-shock in WW1 persons, and later returned to his post at King's College London where he earned a DM in 1918, MRCP in 1921 and was elected FRCP in 1930.

In 1936 he became the director of the Institute of Experimental Psychology at Oxford University. Brown, along with May Smith, Cyril Burt, and John Flügel, were all students of William McDougall while the latter mentioned was a professor at Oxford. He was a Christian and had a lifelong interest in parapsychology. He served on the board of the Society for Psychical Research 1923-1940.

Brown was associated with Harry Price and his National Laboratory of Psychical Research. He attended séances with the medium Helen Duncan at the laboratory and concluded she was fraudulent.

Publications
Mind and Personality: An Essay in Psychology and Philosophy (1970)
Personality and Religion (1946)
War and the Psychological Conditions of Peace (1942)
Psychological Methods of Healing; An Introduction to Psychotherapy (1938)
Mind, Medicine and Metaphysics: The Philosophy of a Physician (1936)
Science and Personality (1929)
Suggestion and Mental Analysis: An Outline of the Theory and Practice of Mind Cure (1922)
 William Brown, 'The psychologist in war-time', Lancet (1939), 1: 1288.
 William Brown, 'The treatment of cases of shell shock in an advanced neurological centre', Lancet (1918), 2: 197.
 William Brown, 'War neuroses', Lancet (1919), 2: 833.

References

Further reading
 Burt, C. (1952). Dr. William Brown Obituary. British Journal of Psychology: Statistical Section, 5, 137–138.
 Sutherland, J.D. (1953). William Brown, D.M., D.Sc., F.R.C.P. Obituary. British Journal of Medical Psychology, 26, 1.

1881 births
1952 deaths
Alumni of King's College London
British psychologists
Fellows of the Royal College of Physicians
Parapsychologists
People educated at The College of Richard Collyer
Presidents of the British Psychological Society
20th-century British psychologists
People from Slinfold